Club Deportivo La Herradura  is a Salvadoran professional football club based in TBD,  El Salvador.
	
The club currently plays in the Tercera Division de Fútbol Salvadoreño.
The Club was founded in 2017 and purchased the spot of Leones de Occidente.

References
	

Football clubs in El Salvador